The Nuntași is a river in Constanța County, Romania. Near the village Nuntași it flows into Lake Nuntași, which is connected with Lake Sinoe, a lagoon of the Black Sea.

References

Rivers of Constanța County
Rivers of Romania
0Nuntasi